The ...in Death series of novels and novellas is written by Nora Roberts under her pseudonym J. D. Robb. Set in a mid-21st-century New York City, they feature NYPSD ("New York City Police and Security Department") lieutenant Eve Dallas and her husband Roarke. The stories also regularly feature other characters, including Captain Ryan Feeney, Detective Delia Peabody, Detective Ian McNab and Dr. Charlotte Mira.

First published in 1995, the series is ongoing as of 2021 with 50 novels and will continue as long as Roberts desires to write it. She has stated that the series will never contain one of Eve and Roarke's children, as the series will end with Eve's eventual pregnancy.

Deaths

 
Below are all deaths – murder victims, murder investigations, and others – that occur in the span of the In Death books, including weapon, cause of death, and the perpetrator. This list does not include any attacks on persons that do not result in death.
 

Note: "stunner" and "laser" are both terms used interchangeably for the fictional weapons that the NYPSD carry in the In Death books; they release a strong electrical, laser-like stun that can do anything from incapacitating to killing the victim.

Bibliography

In Death series

Anthologies and collections

Major characters

Eve Dallas 
 First Appearance: Naked in Death

Eve was found in an alley in Dallas, Texas with severe injuries and evidence of extensive physical and sexual abuse. Her social worker named her and put Eve into a foster home. After reaching the age of majority, Eve has a big desire to move to New York City, where she hopes to become a police officer. Throughout the series, her memories return, mostly through a series of nightmares, revealing a history of incestual rape and the patricide of her father, Richard Troy.

Roarke 
 First Appearance: Naked in Death

In his mid-thirties, Roarke is an immigrant from Dublin, Ireland; in New York City, he is the CEO of Roarke Industries. He owns an old mansion off Central Park that he remodeled to his specifications with very high-tech security. He convinces Eve to move in with him in Glory in Death and then proposes at the end of the book.

Captain Ryan Feeney
 First Appearance: Naked in Death

Eve's former partner and the man who trained her. He no longer works Homicide, but is instead the captain of the Electronics Detection Division (EDD). Feeney likes to dress a bit messily and loves his electronics. He is a dedicated cop and a good husband to his wife, Sheila. They have several children and grandchildren. He is often seen eating a bag of candied nuts, which he may offer to Eve when they are deep in conversation about a case.

Mavis Freestone
 First Appearance: Naked in Death

Mavis is Eve's best and first real friend. The two met when Eve arrested her for being a con artist and they ended up becoming friends. Mavis is described as a tiny, pale woman who radically changes her appearance daily, sporting different lengths, styles, and colors of hair with often matching or contrasting eye color. She has an almost innocent personality which belies the very real street knowledge she possesses; she is also very loyal to Eve.

Lawrence Charles Summerset
 First Appearance: Naked in Death

Lawrence is Roarke's most trusted friend, after Eve. He used to go by the name 'Basil Kolchek' back in Ireland in the 2030s.

Commander Jack Whitney
 First Appearance: Naked in Death

Eve's police commander; her immediate superior. He is one of the few characters in the series, along with the Chief of the NYPSD, Tibble, who is identified as black. Eve respects him greatly. Whitney is a solid, excellent police officer, and for the most part is always on Eve's side. He has at least one daughter (a lawyer) with his wife, Anna Whitney, and endures stoically the parties his wife loves throwing. Surprising Eve, he gets along very well with Roarke and the two have, on rare occasions, smoked and drunk together.

Nadine Furst
 First Appearance: Naked in Death

Nadine is one of the intended victims of the murderer in Glory in Death, but is saved by Eve, who is the primary investigator on the case. She is an ambitious but ethical reporter, who will always protect her source. Nadine is a sharp dresser, a fact Eve finds odd.

Dr. Charlotte Mira
 First Appearance: Naked in Death

Mira is the resident psychiatrist and profiler for the NYPSD. She has several children with her husband, Dennis, and has grandchildren as well. She is a pretty and feminine woman whom Eve often consults on her cases. Eve loves Charlotte very much but has not admitted it to her face; nevertheless, Charlotte knows. Charlotte thinks of Eve as a daughter, a fact which annoyed Mira's own daughter at one point, and throughout the series has gotten Eve to open up to her more and more.

Officer (Detective) Delia Peabody
 First Appearance: Glory in Death
 Temporary aide in Glory and Immortal in Death
 Permanent aide: from Rapture in Death through to Imitation
 Partner: Promotion to Detective, third grade in Imitation in Death

Although her first name is Delia, she is referred to by her surname 'Peabody' throughout the books, as is standard for other police officers. Peabody has a very close relationship with Eve. Peabody comes from a family of "Free-Agers", which is a fictional extension of the New Age movement from the 1980s. Her family is peaceful and pacifistic, but Delia prefers exercising justice the police way. She is a responsible officer, but as the books continue, she becomes more confident in her cases and in teasing Eve, particularly about her sex life with McNab and her sexual fantasies.

Detective Ian McNab
 First Appearance: Vengeance in Death

Of a Scottish background, Ian is a detective in Feeney's Electronics Detection Division. He is particularly good with computers, though not as good as Roarke. Ian is a flashy dresser who, in Eve's words, "prances" rather than walks. Feeney describes him as a known candy thief, and he has been caught at least once pilfering candy bars from Eve's office.

Detective David Baxter
 First Appearance: Vengeance in Death

Another detective from Homicide. Baxter enjoys teasing Eve about anything he can, usually relating to her relationship with Roarke and associated changes; despite this teasing Roarke views Baxter as a solid cop and easygoing person.

Chief Medical Examiner Li Morris
 First Appearance: Rapture in Death

Chief Medical Examiner Morris is the medical examiner Eve requests on all of her high-priority cases. He is mentioned as having 'oddly exotic almond-shaped eyes', and sports a small tattoo of the Grim Reaper on his left pectoral. He has a long black ponytail, which he often ties back with fasteners that match his clothes. He plays the saxophone and sometimes plays gigs at various clubs. He listens to music while performing autopsies and calls Eve his prize pupil for her quick-witted deductions.

Notes

Further reading
Little, Denise, & Hayden, Laura, The Official Nora Roberts Companion (New York: Berkley, 2003). 
Ali, Kecia, Human in Death: Morality and Mortality in J. D. Robb's Novels (Waco, TX: Baylor University Press, 2017).

External links
 J.D. Robb
 Series listing at SciFan
 
 Frequently asked questions about the series
 Podcast in Death - An "In Death" Fandom Podcast

Novels set in the 21st century
Book series introduced in 1995
 
Novel series
Fictional portrayals of the New York City Police Department